

Dinosaurs

Newly named dinosaurs

Synapsids

Non-mammalian

Mammals

References

1930s in paleontology
Paleontology 8